Maurice Joseph Girouard Jr. (born January 15, 1948) is a Canadian-American music journalist and former film and television actor. He is known for playing Jody O'Connell in the American western television series Buckskin.

Life and career 
Nolan was born in Montreal, Quebec. He emigrated to the United States with his family, after his mother's health problems. Nolan attended at a stage school, at an early age for which he then used the stage name Butch Bernard. He also attended at the Jen Loven Swim School, in which Nolan earned a trophy. He began his career in 1952, where he played the uncredited role of the "Child at Finale" in the film Son of Paleface. Nolan co-starred and appeared in films, such as The Grasshopper, The Toy Tiger, The Seven Year Itch, Man Afraid, The Young Warriors, All Mine to Give, The Moonshine War, Kiss Me, Stupid, and Voyage of the Rock Aliens.

In 1958, Nolan starred in the new NBC western television series Buckskin. He played Jody O'Connell. His character was the son of "Mrs. Annie O'Connell" (Sally Brophy). After the series ended, Nolan guest-starred in television programs including Gunsmoke, Bachelor Father, Rawhide, My Friend Flicka, Alfred Hitchcock Presents, The Rifleman, Lassie, The High Chaparral and Wagon Train. He retired his career in 1970, when Nolan then became a writer.

In 1971, Nolan authored a Rolling Stone magazine article about the Beach Boys titled "The Beach Boys: A California Saga". It was unusual in that the story devoted minimal attention to the group's music, and instead focused on the band's internal dynamics and history, particularly around the period when they fell out of step with the 1960s counterculture. According to journalist David Hepworth, the style was unprecedented in the field of music writing, and the "story within was destined to become a classic piece from that brief interlude when pop writing collided with New Journalism ... It combined admiration for the group's achievements with distaste for their strange, inner world in a way that hadn't been done before". A quote from the article, "Don't fuck with the formula", is often attributed to member Mike Love, although Love denied ever saying it.

References

External links 

Rotten Tomatoes profile

1948 births
Living people
Canadian emigrants to the United States
American male child actors
American male film actors
American male television actors
Canadian male child actors
Canadian male film actors
Canadian male television actors
Male actors from Montreal
Western (genre) television actors
20th-century American male writers
20th-century Canadian male writers
20th-century American male actors
20th-century Canadian male actors